Robert Hopkins may refer to:

Bob Hopkins (1934–2015), professional basketball player and coach
Bobb Hopkins, actor/director and founder of the National Hobo Association
Bobby Hopkins (1957–2019), American football player and world champion arm-wrestler
Robert Hopkins (footballer) (born 1961), former English professional football player
Robert Hopkins (screenwriter) (1886–1966), Academy Award nominated screenwriter
Robert E. Hopkins (1915–2009), president of the Optical Society of America
Rob Hopkins, originator of the Transition Towns movement
Robert H. Hopkins (1902–1968), American attorney
Robert Thurston Hopkins (1884–1958), British writer and ghost hunter